Na Kang is a sub-district (tambon) in Pak Khat District, in Bueng Kan Province, northeastern Thailand. As of 2010, it had a population of 3,979 persons, with jurisdiction over seven villages.

References

Tambon of Bueng Kan province
Populated places in Bueng Kan province
Pak Khat District